Del Puerto Creek, originally Arroyo de La Puerta (Creek of the Door) is a tributary of the San Joaquin River draining eastern slopes of part of the Diablo Range within the Central Valley of California, United States.   The Creek enters the San Joaquin River, about 2 1/2 miles southeast of Grayson, California in Stanislaus County.

History
Arroyo de La Puerta was a watering place on El Camino Viejo named for the narrow exit a "Puerta" or Door, where the creek emerged from the La Puerta Canyon into the San Joaquin Valley.  It provided the southern boundary of Rancho Pescadero (Grimes) and the northern boundary of Rancho Del Puerto.

References

External links
  CA 130 Del Puerto Canyon accessed November 1, 2011
  STANISLAUS COUNTY BIRDING SITES: Del Puerto Canyon www.stanislausbirds.org accessed November 1, 2011

Rivers of Stanislaus County, California
Tributaries of the San Joaquin River
Diablo Range
El Camino Viejo
Rivers of Northern California